Mieczysław Wawrzusiak (born 21 October 1928 - 4 September 1994) was a former Polish footballer who played as a midfielder.

Biography

Wawrzusiak was born in Kraków and started playing football for his local team Zwierzyniecki Kraków, making his first team debut in 1945. It was with Zwierzyniecki that Wawrzusiak is most remembered for. In 1948 he joined Lechia Gdańsk for a season, making 7 appearances in the league. After one season with Lechia he rejoined Zwierzyniecki for the following season, before having short term spells with AKS Chorzów and Polonia Przemyśl, before he rejoined Lechia making a further 10 appearances scoring 4 goals. In 1953 he moved back to Kraków to play with Cracovia. During his time with Cracovia he played 49 games, 40 of those coming in the I liga. In 1956 he rejoined Zwierzyniecki Kraków where he spent the rest of his career. He died on 4 September 1994. In 2011, Zwierzyniecki Kraków's 90th anniversary, Wawrzusiak was honoured with being Zwierzyniecki's greatest ever academy graduate.

Personal life

He is the nephew of former Wisła Kraków and Poland international goalkeeper Maksymilian Koźmin, and the uncle of former Wisła Kraków and ŁKS Łódź goalkeeper Janusz Adamczyk.

References

1928 births
1994 deaths
MKS Cracovia (football) players
Lechia Gdańsk players
AKS Chorzów players
Polish footballers
Association football midfielders
Footballers from Kraków